HSC Speed Jet is a high speed craft owned and operated by Greek/Cypriot ferry company Seajets. The ship was built in 1996 by Australian shipyard Austal; its length is 83 m and can achieve the speed of nearly 40 kn (74 km/h). The capacity of the vessel is 156 cars and 650 passengers. In the past, the ship was owned by several European shipping companies, including Scandlines, and served on Scandinavian as well as Mediterranean maritime routes between Spain and North Africa. From 2002 to 2022 she was owned by SNAV and serves on the Adriatic route between Ancona and Split. In winter, the ship operates the routes in Tyrrhenian Sea. On February 9, 2015, she started operating the route between Nueva Esparta and Anzoátegui states in Venezuela.

Sisterships
 Power Jet
 Avemar Dos
 Tallink Autoexpress 2

References

External links
 Croazia Jet on Austal official web pages

Ships of Seajets
Passenger ships of Italy
Ships built by Austal
1996 ships